Clivina flava is a species of ground beetle in the subfamily Scaritinae. It was described by Jules Putzeys in 1868.

References

flava
Beetles described in 1868